Unpretty Rapstar (Hangul: 언프리티 랩스타) is a South Korean rap competition TV show that airs on Mnet. It is known as the female counterpart of Show Me The Money. The contestants compete with each other to get a chance to participate in the new song that the producers made.

Seasons

Season 1 (Winter 2015)

Season 2 (Fall 2015)

Season 3 (2016)

Discography

References

Hip hop television
Korean-language television shows
South Korean music television shows
Music competitions in South Korea
2015 South Korean television series debuts
Mnet (TV channel) original programming